Dipterocarpus tempehes is a species of tree in the family Dipterocarpaceae. It is endemic to Borneo. The tree is found in swampy areas and along streams.

References

tempehes
Endemic flora of Borneo
Trees of Borneo
Flora of the Borneo lowland rain forests